Cape Fear is a 1962 American noir psychological thriller film starring Gregory Peck, Robert Mitchum, and Polly Bergen. It was adapted by James R. Webb from the 1957 novel The Executioners by John D. MacDonald. The picture was directed by J. Lee Thompson from storyboards devised by original director Alfred Hitchcock and released on April 12, 1962. The film concerns an attorney whose family is stalked by a criminal he helped to send to jail. The supporting cast features Martin Balsam, Telly Savalas and Barrie Chase.

Cape Fear was remade in 1991 by Martin Scorsese. Peck, Mitchum, and Balsam all appeared as different characters in the remake.

Plot
In Southeast Georgia, Max Cady is released from prison after serving an eight-year sentence for rape. He promptly tracks down Sam Bowden, a lawyer whom he holds personally responsible for his conviction because Sam interrupted his attack and testified against him. Cady begins to stalk and subtly threaten Bowden's family. He kills the Bowden family dog, though Sam cannot prove Cady did it. A friend of Bowden, Police Chief Mark Dutton, attempts to intervene on Bowden's behalf, but he cannot prove Cady guilty of any crime.

Bowden hires private detective Charlie Sievers. Cady brutally rapes a young woman, Diane Taylor, when he brings her home, but neither the private eye nor Bowden can persuade her to testify. Bowden hires three men to beat up Cady and coerce him to leave town, but the plan backfires when Cady gets the better of all three. Cady's lawyer vows to have Bowden disbarred.

Afraid for his wife Peggy and 14-year-old daughter Nancy, Bowden takes them to their houseboat in the Cape Fear region of North Carolina. In an attempt to trick Cady, Bowden makes it seem as though he has gone to Atlanta. He fully expects Cady to follow his wife and daughter, and he plans on killing Cady to end the battle. On a dark night, Bowden and local deputy Kersek hide in the swamp nearby, but Cady realizes that Kersek is there and drowns him, leaving no evidence of a struggle. Eluding Bowden and setting the houseboat adrift down current, Cady first attacks Mrs. Bowden on the boat, causing Bowden to go to her rescue. Meanwhile, Cady swims back to shore to attack Nancy. Bowden realizes what has happened, and also swims ashore.

The two men engage in a final fight on the riverbank. Bowden manages to reach his gun, which he had dropped, and shoots Cady, wounding and disabling him. Cady tells Bowden, "Finish the job", but Bowden decides to do the thing that Cady earlier told him would be unbearableput him in prison for the rest of his life, to "count the years, the months, the hours". In the morning light, the Bowden family are together on a boat, traveling with police back to port.

Cast

 Gregory Peck as Sam Bowden
 Robert Mitchum as Max Cady
 Polly Bergen as Peggy Bowden
 Lori Martin as Nancy Bowden
 Martin Balsam as Mark Dutton
 Jack Kruschen as Dave Grafton
 Telly Savalas as Charlie Sievers
 Barrie Chase as Diane Taylor

In addition, Edward Platt, the future "Chief" on the television series Get Smart, and November 1958 Playboy Playmate centerfold Joan Staley make brief appearances as a judge and a waitress, respectively.

Production

Development
Cornel Wilde acquired the rights to John D. MacDonald's novel The Executioners for $30,000 in 1958. Gregory Peck had his own production company, Melville Productions, in partnership with Sy Bartlett, which had made The Big Country and Pork Chop Hill and they later purchased the rights. They planned to make it after The Guns of Navarone. Peck was impressed by J. Lee Thompson's work on that film and hired him for Cape Fear. Peck said his goal was to make "first class professional entertainment intelligently done."

Casting
Telly Savalas was screen tested for the role, but later played private eye Charlie Sievers. Robert Mitchum refused to play Max Cady when he was first offered the part, but eventually accepted it after Peck and Thompson delivered him flowers and a case of bourbon.

Thompson wanted Hayley Mills, whom he had cast in Tiger Bay, to play the daughter, but Mills was unavailable.

Polly Bergen signed in December 1960. It was her first film in eight years.

Filming
Principal photography of Cape Fear began on April 6 and ended in June 1961. Thompson envisioned the film in black and white, believing that shooting the film in color would lessen the atmosphere. As an Alfred Hitchcock fan, he wanted to have Hitchcockian elements in the film, such as unusual lighting angles, an eerie musical score, closeups, and subtle hints rather than graphic depictions of the violence Cady has in mind for the family. Hitchcock collaborators Robert F. Boyle and George Tomasini served as production designer and editor.
 
The outdoor scenes were filmed on location in Savannah, Georgia; Stockton, California; and the Universal Studios backlot at Universal City, California. The indoor scenes were done at Universal Studios Soundstage. Mitchum had a real-life aversion to Savannah, where as a teenager, he had been charged with vagrancy and put on a chain gang. This resulted in a number of the outdoor scenes being shot at Ladd's Marina in Stockton, including the culminating conflict on the houseboat at the end of the movie.

The scene in which Mitchum attacks Polly Bergen's character on the houseboat was almost completely improvised. Before the scene was filmed, Thompson suddenly told a crew member: "Bring me a dish of eggs!" Mitchum's rubbing the eggs on Bergen was not scripted and Bergen's reactions were real. She also suffered back injuries from being knocked around so much. She felt the impact of the "attack" for days.  While filming the scene, Mitchum cut open his hand, leading Bergen to recall: "his hand was covered in blood, my back was covered in blood. We just kept going, caught up in the scene. They came over and physically stopped us."

In the source novel The Executioners, by John D. MacDonald, Cady was a soldier court-martialed and convicted on then Lieutenant Bowden's testimony for the brutal rape of a 14-year-old girl. The censors stepped in, banned the use of the word "rape", and stated that depicting Cady as a soldier reflected adversely on U.S. military personnel.

Music
Bernard Herrmann, as often in his scores, uses a reduced version of the symphony orchestra. Here, other than a 46-piece string section (slightly larger than usual for film scores), he adds four flutes (doubling on two piccolos, two alto flutes in G, and two bass flutes in C) and eight French horns. No use is made of further wind instruments or percussion.

In his 2002 book A Heart at Fire's Center: The Life and Music of Bernard Herrmann, Stephen C. Smith writes:
 "Yet Herrmann was perfect for Cape Fear ... Herrmann's score reinforces Cape Fear's savagery. Mainly a synthesis of past devices, its power comes from their imaginative application and another ingenious orchestration ... a rehearsal for his similar orchestration on Hitchcock's Torn Curtain in 1966. Like similar 'psychological' Herrmann scores, dissonant string combinations suggest the workings of a killer's mind (most startlingly in a queasy device for cello and bass viols as Cadey prepares to attack the prostitute). Hermann's prelude searingly establishes the dramatic conflict: descending and ascending chromatic voices move slowly towards each other from their opposite registers, finally crossing–just as Boden and Cadey's game of cat-and-mouse will end in deadly confrontation."

Release

Censorship
Although the word "rape" was entirely removed from the script before shooting, the film still enraged the censors, who worried that "there was a continuous threat of sexual assault on a child." To accept the film, British censors required extensive editing and deleting of specific scenes.

After making around 6 minutes of cuts, the film still nearly garnered a British X rating (meaning at the time, "Suitable for those aged 18 and older", not necessarily meaning there was sexually explicit or violent content). Thompson said he had to make 161 cuts; the censor argued it was fifteen main cuts but admitted they took 5 minutes. The censor said this was primarily because the film involved threat of sexual assault against a child.

Home media
Cape Fear was first made available on VHS on March 1, 1992. On May 14, 1992 it was released on laserdisc.  It was later re-released on VHS, as well as DVD, on September 18, 2001. The film was released onto Blu-ray on January 8, 2013. It contains production photos and a "making-of" featurette.

Critical response
Upon its release, the film received positive but cautious feedback from critics due to the film's content. 

Bosley Crowther of The New York Times praised the "tough, tight script", as well as the film's "steady and starkly sinister style." He went on to conclude his review by saying, "this is really one of those shockers that provokes disgust and regret." The entertainment-trade magazine Variety reviewed the film as "competent and visually polished", while commenting on Mitchum's performance as a "menacing omnipresence."

Legacy
Although it makes no acknowledgement of Cape Fear, the episode "The Force of Evil" from the 1977 NBC television series Quinn Martin's Tales of the Unexpected uses virtually the same plot, merely introducing an additional supernatural element to the released prisoner.

The film and its remake serve as the basis for the 1993 The Simpsons episode "Cape Feare" in which Sideshow Bob, recently released from prison, stalks the Simpson family in an attempt to kill Bart.

In April 2007, Newsweek selected Cady as one of the 10 best villains in cinema history. Specifically, the scene where Cady attacks Sam's family was ranked number 36 on Bravo's 100 Scariest Movie Moments in 2004.

A consumer poll on the Internet Movie Database rates Cape Fear as the 65th-best trial film, although the trial scenes are merely incidental to the plot.

The film is recognized by American Film Institute in these lists:
 2001: AFI's 100 Years...100 Thrills – #61
 2003: AFI's 100 Years...100 Heroes & Villains:
 Max Cady – #28 Villain

See also 

 List of films featuring home invasions
 List of films featuring surveillance
 Trial movies

References

Further reading
 Bergman, Paul; Asimow, Michael. (2006) Reel justice: the courtroom goes to the movies (Kansas City: Andrews and McMeel). ; ; ; .
 Machura, Stefan and Robson, Peter, eds. Law and Film: Representing Law in Movies (Cambridge: Blackwell Publishing, 2001). Thain, Gerald J., "Cape Fear, Two Versions and Two Visions Separated by Thirty Years." , . 176 pages.

External links
 
 
 
 

1962 films
1960s legal films
1960s psychological thriller films
American black-and-white films
American psychological thriller films
Films scored by Bernard Herrmann
Films about families
American films about revenge
Films about stalking
Films based on American novels
Films based on thriller novels
Films based on works by John D. MacDonald
Films directed by J. Lee Thompson
Films set in Georgia (U.S. state)
Films set in North Carolina
Films shot in California
Films shot in Georgia (U.S. state)
Films shot in Savannah, Georgia
Films set on boats
Home invasions in film
Legal thriller films
Films about rape
Southern Gothic films
Universal Pictures films
American neo-noir films
1960s English-language films
1960s American films